Shalom Danino (born 30 April 1956) is an Israeli businessman and politician who currently serves as a member of the Knesset for Likud.

Biography
Danino was born in Ofakim in 1956 into a family that had immigrated from Morocco. He served in the Israel Air Force for ten years, obtained a bachelor's degree from Ben-Gurion University of the Negev and a certificate of management from Bar-Ilan University. He currently owns a nursing home and real estate company.

Prior to the 2022 Knesset elections Danino was placed twenty-second on the Likud list, a slot reserved for candidates from the Negev. He was elected to the Knesset as the party won 32 seats.

His brother Yitzhak is mayor of Ofakim.

References

External links

1956 births
Living people
People from Ofakim
Ben-Gurion University of the Negev alumni
Bar-Ilan University alumni
Israeli businesspeople
Jewish Israeli politicians
Likud politicians
Members of the 25th Knesset (2022–)